Kung Fu Panda: Secrets of the Scroll is an animated short film in the Kung Fu Panda film series. It was included on the 2015 Digital HD and 2016 Blu-ray, and DVD re-release of Kung Fu Panda and Kung Fu Panda 2. The short tells both the origin stories of how the Furious Five came together and how Po gained his love for Kung Fu.

Jack Black, James Hong, Dustin Hoffman, Seth Rogen, David Cross, Randall Duk Kim and Lucy Liu reprise their roles from the movies,  while Kari Wahlgren and James Sie replace Angelina Jolie and Jackie Chan as Tigress and Monkey, respectively.

Premise 
The introduction, which takes place a bit before Kung Fu Panda 3, shows Po realizing that his dad, Mr Ping, has been giving away his things as bonus gifts to customers, and accidentally gave away his toys of the Furious Five. As he searches for them, Oogway's narration asks whether there is any real difference between an accident and destiny, thus setting the scene for the story.

10 years before the events of the first Kung Fu Panda, a younger Tigress is training under Shifu, but always seems to disappoint him by not conforming to his strict style. When Master Oogway and Shifu order noodles from Mister Ping's restaurant, a young Po (who was left in charge of the restaurant while his dad was absent) accidentally sneezes into Shifu's, making him sick. To make matters worse, a seemingly-unstoppable warrior named Boar is en route to the Valley of Peace, defeating every Kung Fu master who opposes him. An incapacitated Shifu has no choice but to delegate to Tigress, giving her a scroll with the names of four warriors who can defeat Boar. At the same time, Po writes his own scroll with possible ideas for his future career, only to throw it out at his father's insistence. Tigress accidentally loses her scroll and mistakes Po's for hers. Po's scroll contains the names of "Cleaner", "Comedian", "Dancer", and "Doctor". This causes Tigress to gather Cleaner Crane, Comedian Monkey, Dancer Viper, and Doctor Mantis instead of the assigned warriors. Tigress is impressed by the skills they demonstrate and assumes that Shifu will be proud of her. However, once she returns, and the mistake is discovered, Shifu becomes angry, disappointing Tigress. As she sulks, Oogway encourages her to be herself rather than Shifu, so she decides to confront Boar. At first, she sticks to Shifu's style and is defeated, but she gets help from the others, who manage to stall Boar with their unique styles. In an epiphany moment, she finally embraces her own style and easily overpowers Boar with the help of her new teammates to defeat him. By chance, Po witnesses the entire fight, thus gaining his passion for Kung Fu. Tigress returns to the Jade Palace, where Shifu finally admits he is proud of her and gives her access to the training room to perfect her "Tigress" style. He also invites Crane, Monkey, Viper, and Mantis to stay, deciding their own styles can also be refined.

The ending returns to the present, where Po finds his toys with a bunny boy. But watching the boy play with the same passion he'd had all those years ago convinces Po to let him keep them. Po then admits to the Furious Five that his Five are "where they're meant to be" and that, in fact, he already has the "real thing right here". "

Voice cast
Jack Black as Po
Dustin Hoffman as Shifu and Warrior
Kari Wahlgren as Tigress
Tara Macri as Teenage Tigress
Seth Rogen as Mantis
David Cross as Crane
Lucy Liu as Viper
James Sie as Monkey and Great Master Viper
Randall Duk Kim as Oogway
James Hong as Mr Ping
Eliott Guenodeon as Young Bunny and Young Pig
Stephen Kearin as Master Mongrel
Joseph Izzo as Palace Goose and Sheep
Jerry Clarke as Gorilla
Kelly Stables as Mother Bunny
Jayden Lund as Boar
Peter Cilella as Goat

Accolades

Notes

References

2015 animated films
2015 short films
2010s American animated films
2010s animated short films
20th Century Fox short films
American animated short films
DreamWorks Animation animated short films
Films scored by Lorne Balfe
Films scored by Hans Zimmer
Kung Fu Panda films
2010s English-language films